Minnie Cooper is the stage name of Aaron Farley, an Australian drag performer.

Career 
Cooper was born and raised in Granville, Sydney. She started out as a chorus singer in musicals before performing in drag when she was thirty-one years old.

She has been a semifinalist on the eighth season of Australia's Got Talent in 2016. In 2018 she was featured on All Together Now and Celebrity Name Game Australia. She also appeared in Season 4 of Jack Whitehall: Travels with My Father.

She has performed in front of Cher at the 2018 Mardi Gras parade, and in front of Kylie Minogue the following year.

She has won numerous DIVA (Drag Industry Variety Awards), including Entertainer of the Year, Sydney’s Favourite Drag Queen, and Choreographer of the Year.

In 2018, she starred in her own one-woman show, "From Chorus Boy to Leading Lady".

In 2022, she competed on the second season of RuPaul's Drag Race Down Under. She was eliminated in the fourth episode, after having received negative critiques for her impersonation of Ellen DeGeneres in the Snatch Game and after having fought with several other contestants.

References

Living people
Australian drag queens
RuPaul's Drag Race Down Under contestants
Year of birth missing (living people)